Bento dos Santos Kangamba (Moxico, born July 6, 1965) is a businessman, politician and former general officer of Angolan Army and owner of the football team Kabuscorp Sport Clube do Palanca. Born in Moxico in Angola, but was in the Lunda provinces that grew. He worked in the area of logistics and was one of the drivers of the sale so " orthodox " meat / chicken from the army on the black market. At the time, the street vendors aka " Quinguilas " led him to court after they complained of having given the money without which they received the goods. He was found guilty in court serving a two years prison. At the time the Central Committee of the MPLA, which was part, drove her to her case not spot the party After the incident Kangamba remade politically becoming one of the most publicized MPLA in urban Luanda (and in some areas of the country). It is currently the first secretary of CAP 114, the lever (card militant LA – 525291). He was readmitted in the party structures (Luanda Provincial Committee and Central Committee) and at the same time learned not have much confidence in their colleagues MPLA.

Early life and career 
Bento dos Santos Kangamba (Moxico, June 6, 1965) is a businessman, politician and former general officer of Angolan Army and owner of the football team Kabuscorp Sport Clube do Palanca. At 15 years old he joined the MPLA. His father was known as a supporter of this party that guerrillas roamed the area east of the country. The family was the owner of certain assets, including some trucks that have been burned by UNITA at the time of the armed conflict. Parents are in the East and the son is criticized for "wasting money in Luanda while the country are not very good in Luena." He served the armed wing of the regime and reached the rank of brigadier, whose reserve part. Your economic asset is considered complex, starting with the fact of not knowing his Cabinet. There is information that through the Ministry of Finance receives funds "impulse" of an "endless" old debt the state owes to him. Is associated with diamond mining area in the Lunda, having a partner, one of the dredges, Eduardo Kwangana, President of PRS. Founded in the 1990s a company, "Organizations Kabuscorp" whose heritage includes land in Samba, a fifth under construction in the areas of Futungo, to which he gave his name, "Thursday Kamgamba". It is connoted with a limited company representations, Rangol based in Workers Quarter. What gives you more visibility is a football team, the club Kabuscorp Sport Clube do Palanca, who created in December 1994, becoming the first Angolan to have a football club in the country. Is intended to interfere with the work of the coach of his team. For more than 10 years he left to live in the neighborhood Palanca (Alvalade and now lived in an apartment in New Life T4), but within the party goes up by resident or chief of the district, as it is called and weekends visiting Palanca. It pays attention to philanthropy and supports entertainment initiatives (contests, concerts, etc.) so it has the reputation of "entrepreneur of youth." One of his biggest vices is gambling / casino. Has arrived to spend about $100,000 U.S. in one night.

His Football Team 
Kabuscorp Sport Clube do Palanca, known only by Kabuscorp, is a football club that has its headquarters in Luanda, capital of Angola. It was founded in December 1994. The Kabuscorp Palanca originated in Cazenga district where the weekends young residents in the neighborhoods of Palanca, Rangel and Cazenga games promoted inter municipal and communal level. In this sense, and after some time, formed a club whose members were young Cazenga and Palanca, who joined forces and started making games in the friendly province of Luanda. With deccorrer time, the club was organized, and it became official in the statutes governing their actions. The club was recognized the Provincial Delegation of Sports, and participates in provincial and national championships. The highest level reached in the sports side was ranking the 1st place in the National League Division 1 (in football) in this year's tournament Girabola.

Personal life 
Avelina Escórcio Dos Santos, wife of Bento Kangamba married Bento Kangamba in 2011. Daughter of the elder brother of the Angolan president, businessman Avelino dos Santos, and sister of Catarino Santos, an influential and well-known figure of Luanda. The bride works as a secretary uncle, President José Eduardo dos Santos, and this marriage Benedict Kangamba Dos Santos became the presidential family. To patronize marriage Kangamba Benedict chose another great figure of the majority party, General Higino Carneiro, during marriage president of the republic Jose Eduardo Dos Santos be attended by uncle of the bride.

References 

1965 births
Living people
Angolan businesspeople
Kabuscorp S.C.P. non-playing staff